In radar-related subjects and in JTIDS, a data mile is a unit of distance equal to 6000 feet (1.8288 kilometres or 0.987 nautical miles). An international mile is exactly 0.88 of a data mile.

The speed of light is 983571056 ft/s, or about one foot per nanosecond.  If it were exactly one foot per nanosecond, and a target was one data mile away, then the radar return from that target would arrive 12 microseconds after the transmission.  (Recall that radar was developed during World War II in America and England, while both were using English units.  It was convenient for them to relate 1 data mile to 12 microseconds, whereas the modern tendency would be to approximate the speed of light as 300,000 km/s.)

References

 http://scienceworld.wolfram.com/physics/DataMile.html

Radar